Alan Henry Brooke, 3rd Viscount Brookeborough,  (born 30 June 1952), is a Northern Irish peer and landowner. He is one of the 92 hereditary peers who remain in the House of Lords; he sits as a crossbencher. He is the current Lord Lieutenant of Fermanagh.

Early life and career
Lord Brookeborough was educated at Harrow School, Millfield and at the Royal Agricultural College (now Royal Agricultural University), Cirencester.

He joined the British Army in 1971, being commissioned into the 17th/21st Lancers. In 1977 he transferred to the Ulster Defence Regiment (UDR), which was to become the Royal Irish Regiment in 1992. He was promoted to Lieutenant-Colonel in 1993, and became Honorary Colonel of the 4th/5th Battalion, Royal Irish Rangers, in 1997.

Marriage and family
Lord Brookeborough (known to his family and friends as Alan Brooke or Alan Brookeborough) married Janet Elizabeth Cooke (daughter of J. P. Cooke, of Doagh), now Viscountess Brookeborough, in 1980. They farm the  Colebrooke Estate, just outside Brookeborough in County Fermanagh, Northern Ireland. The centre of the estate is Colebrooke Park, an early 19th-century Neoclassical country house that is the ancestral seat of the Brooke family.

Lord Brookeborough has no children. His younger brother, The Hon Christopher Brooke (who has four sons), is heir presumptive to the viscountcy. Lord Brookeborough intends to leave the Colebrooke Estate, including Colebrooke Park, to his nephew, his brother's eldest son and heir. He is third cousin to Queen Camilla, both descending from George Cubitt, Lord Ashcombe.

Field Marshal Alan Brooke, 1st Viscount Alanbrooke (1883–1963), was also a member of the same family. Lord Alanbrooke was an uncle of Basil Brooke, 1st Viscount Brookeborough.

Honours
Brooke succeeded his father as Viscount Brookeborough in 1987. Although he lost his automatic right to a seat in the House of Lords, with all other hereditary peers after the passage of the House of Lords Act 1999, Lord Brookeborough remained in the House as an elected crossbench hereditary peer.

He was a Lord-in-waiting to The Queen beginning in 1997. He is President of the Co Fermanagh Unionist Association and was appointed an independent member of the Northern Ireland Policing Board in 2001. Lord Brookeborough represented The Queen as Lord-in-Waiting at the arrival of U.S. President Barack Obama and First Lady Michelle Obama in the United Kingdom on their state visit on 24 May 2011.

Arms

See also
 List of Northern Ireland members of the House of Lords

References

External links

1952 births
Living people
Viscounts in the Peerage of the United Kingdom
Alumni of the Royal Agricultural University
High Sheriffs of County Fermanagh
Ulster Defence Regiment officers
17th/21st Lancers officers
Royal Irish Regiment (1992) officers
People educated at Harrow School
People educated at Millfield
Military personnel from County Fermanagh
Deputy Lieutenants of Fermanagh
Lord-Lieutenants of Fermanagh
Crossbench hereditary peers
Knights of the Garter
Hereditary peers elected under the House of Lords Act 1999